Clarence Maurice Mitchell III (December 14, 1939 – October 11, 2012) was an American politician from Baltimore, Maryland who served in the Maryland Senate and the Maryland House of Delegates.

Background
Mitchell was born in St. Paul, Minnesota, December 14, 1939.  The son of Clarence M. Mitchell Jr. and Juanita Jackson Mitchell, he attended Baltimore City public schools and then Gonzaga High School in Washington, D.C.  After high school, Mitchell attended the University of Maryland and  Morgan State University. He was a member of Kappa Alpha Psi fraternity.

Career
Mitchell first served in the Maryland House of Delegates, Legislative District 4 (Baltimore City) from 1963 to 1967; he was elected at 22 and sworn in at 23 years old.

After 4 years in the House, he ran for the Maryland Senate and won. During the next 20 years he represented Senate, Legislative Districts 10, 38 & 39, all in Baltimore City. 1967-86.  During that time he was the Deputy majority leader, 1975–78, Majority whip, 1979, member of the Judicial Proceedings Committee, Co-chair of the Joint Committee on Federal Relations and  Chairman of the Executive Nominations Committee.

On the national level, Mitchell was also elected to serve as President of the National Black Caucus of State Legislators, from 1979 to 1985.

Controversy
Mitchell pleaded no contest in 1964 to charges of failing to file income taxes.

In 1983 he was charged with carrying a weapon onto an airplane.

A year after leaving the Senate in 1986, Mitchell was convicted of attempting to obstruct a grand jury, committing wire fraud and attempting to tamper with a federal investigation in the Wedtech scandal. He was sentenced to 54 months in prison, but was released after serving 18 months.

Personal life
Mitchell was married to Joyce Ellis. Their seven children include Clarence Mitchell IV, who served in the Maryland House of Delegates and the Maryland State Senate, and also hosted The C4 Show on WBAL radio.

Mitchell died October 11, 2012, in Randallstown, Maryland.

References

External links

1939 births
2012 deaths
African-American state legislators in Maryland
American people convicted of tax crimes
Democratic Party members of the Maryland House of Delegates
Democratic Party Maryland state senators
Maryland politicians convicted of crimes
People convicted of obstruction of justice
Politicians convicted of mail and wire fraud
Politicians from Baltimore
Mitchell family of Maryland